Serena Daolio (born June 21, 1972 in Carpi, Italy) is an Italian soprano singer.

Biography 
After getting her diploma at the conservatory Arrigo Boito in Parma, Daolio finished her training with the help of Virginia Zeani and won the first prize at the competitions Masini and Zandonai. She had her debut in Traviata where she played the main part and won the competition Primo Palcascenico in Cesena. In 2004, she was awarded the Bruson prize by Renato Bruson himself and in 2005 Daolio won the Francisco Viñas Award in Barcelona. Her performance in Pagliacci, directed by Giancarlo del Monaco, which was shown in Teatro Real of Madrid in 2007, has been the most significant act.

References

External links 
 https://web.archive.org/web/20110722033219/http://www.artistica.fi.it/daolio.html

Italian operatic sopranos
Living people
1972 births
People from Carpi, Emilia-Romagna
21st-century Italian women opera singers
Musicians from the Province of Modena